Dancing Girl may refer to:

 Dancing Girl (Mohenjo-daro), a bronze statuette dating around 2500 BC
 "The Dancing Girl" (short story), an 1890 short story by the Japanese writer Mori Ogai
 The Dancing Girl (film), a lost American 1915 silent film drama
 Dancing Girl, a 1957 Japanese film directed by Hiroshi Shimizu
 The Dancing Girl, an 1891 play by Henry Arthur Jones
 Dancing Girl (Rabindranath Tagore), a 1905 painting by Rabindranath Tagore
 Dancing Girl (Maihime), fictional work by Yasunari Kawabata based on the life of Olga Sapphire

See also
Dancing Girls (disambiguation)